Agincourt GO Station is a GO Transit railway station in  Toronto, Ontario, Canada. On the Stouffville line, it serves the Agincourt neighbourhood of the former suburb of Scarborough.

History
The station's track was once used by Toronto and Nipissing Railway and later Grand Trunk Railway and finally by Canadian National Railway. TNR opened a simple wooden station at Agincourt in 1871. (There was also a separate CPR Agincourt station located further east, built in 1884 by the Ontario and Quebec Railway which later merged with the Canadian Pacific Railway. This station no longer exists.) The CN station lasted into the 1970's and was demolished to accommodate the first Agincourt GO Station built in 1982. 

In 2018, EllisDon Transit Infrastructure was awarded a contract to expand the station for increased Regional Express Rail service. The project will include construction of a second platform, improved pedestrian and vehicle connections, and a new station building. By February 2021, the old station building built in 1982 was demolished. By October 2021, the new station building was completed; however, at that time work still remained for tracks, platforms and the parking area.  By November 2022, two new pedestrian tunnels had opened between the north- and southbound platforms which also allows community members to cross the right-of-way underground; the pedestrian level crossing at Marilyn Avenue had closed. A new parking lot with 74 spaces was added at the north end of the station area along with a pick-up, drop-off area for 24 vehicles.

Station description
This description pertains to the second Agincourt GO Station which was under construction . The second station has the following features:
 Station building featuring waiting area, digital displays, wood paneled ceiling, phone charging stations, accessible washrooms 
 Designed for LEED certification
 Passenger pick-up and drop-off area (Kiss & Ride)
 Indoor bike storage room for eight bicycles
 Two tracks and two platforms
 Two pedestrian tunnels with elevators
 Canopies and integrated platform shelters
 Connection to Sheppard Avenue at the south end of the platforms

Connecting transit
The Toronto Transit Commission's 85 Sheppard East and 985 Sheppard East Express bus routes links Agincourt Station to Don Mills station in the west, the 85 and 985B continues east into Scarborough while the 985A continues express to Scarborough Centre station.

Underpass construction
When the Sheppard East LRT (currently a defunct project) was a plan back in 2010, it required a grade separation of Sheppard Avenue East and the GO train tracks. This led contractors from the City of Toronto government and TTC to build a bridge for the GO train tracks, while having Sheppard Avenue move under it, as the light rail vehicles would not have been able to cross the GO tracks at ground level. On July 3, 2012 the underpass was completed and opened to regular traffic, which was five months ahead of schedule. However, in April 2019, Ontario premier Doug Ford announced that the provincial government would extend Line 4 Sheppard to McCowan Road at some unspecified time in the future, replacing the proposed Sheppard East LRT.

The new underpass improves not only the flow of traffic along Sheppard Avenue, as vehicles no longer have to wait at a rail crossing, but also GO train service. The bridge also allows for two-way service on this portion of the line. Building the bridge also meant that the parking capacity of the station could be expanded. Before that project, parking capacity was only 297, but it has now been increased to 342 spaces.

References

External links

GO Transit railway stations
Railway stations in Toronto
Transport in Scarborough, Toronto
Railway stations in Canada opened in 1982
1982 establishments in Ontario